The Novgorod electoral district was a constituency created for the 1917 Russian Constituent Assembly election. The electoral district covered the Novgorod Governorate. Eight seats in the Constituent Assembly were assigned to the Novgorod constituency.

Whilst Novgorod was an agrarian province, the Bolsheviks obtained a good vote. This might have been due to the fact that many inhabitants were accustomed to perform seasonal work in nearby Petrograd. 4 local peasants lists did not qualify to run in the election.

Results

References

Electoral districts of the Russian Constituent Assembly election, 1917
Novgorod Governorate